Richard John Fencl (February 24, 1910 – June 25, 1972) was an American football end who played one season with the Philadelphia Eagles of the National Football League. He played college football at Northwestern University and attended St. Philip High High School in Chicago, Illinois.

References

External links
Just Sports Stats

1910 births
1972 deaths
Players of American football from Chicago
American football ends
Northwestern Wildcats football players
Philadelphia Eagles players